The Yuryuzan (Yuryuzán; , Yürüźän) is a river in the Republic of Bashkortostan and Chelyabinsk Oblast in Russia, a left tributary of the Ufa (Kama basin).

The name of the river originates from the Bashkir language and means "The big river".

Course
The Yuryuzan has its sources in the slopes of Mount Yamantau. Its valley marks the southwestern limit of the Nurgush. Finally it flows into the Pavlovskoye Reservoir near Karaidel. It freezes up in the second half of October – early December and stays under the ice until April. The river is navigable within the first  of its estuary. The towns of Yuryuzan and Ust-Katav are located on the river Yuryuzan. The Yuryuzan is very popular river for easy rafting.

References

External links

Стрекозы - Сайт о стрекозах (Odonata) Южного Урала

Rivers of Chelyabinsk Oblast
Rivers of Bashkortostan